Andrew John Brown (20 February 1936 – 15 April 2022) was an Australian professional rugby league footballer who played in the 1950s and 1960s. An Australian international and New South Wales interstate representative five-eighth, and later lock forward, he played club football in Sydney's NSWRFL Premiership, captaining Newtown and later Penrith in their inaugural season.

Playing career
While playing in Sydney's NSWRFL Premiership for the Newtown club, Brown gained representative selection in the City, New South Wales and Australian teams. 

In 1958, he was selected to make his debut for the Australian national team, becoming Kangaroo No. 335. 

He was selected for the first two tests against Great Britain but missed the decider due to injury.

Having been released by Newtown in 1964, Brown was signed by second division club Penrith, who later gained entry into the first division premiership for the 1967 NSWRFL season. He captained Penrith in the opening rounds of their inaugural season before a leg injury ended his season.

For the Newtown Jets' centenary celebrations the club named its "Team of the Century" (1908–2008) which included Brown as a five-eighth.

References

1936 births
2022 deaths
Australian rugby league players
Newtown Jets players
Rugby league five-eighths
New South Wales rugby league team players
Australia national rugby league team players
City New South Wales rugby league team players
Penrith Panthers players
Penrith Panthers captains
Rugby league players from Sydney